Hammerstein is a town in Germany.

Hammerstein may also refer to:

Hammerstein (surname)
Hammerstein (robot), a character in the comic 2000 AD
Hammerstein Ballroom, a ballroom in New York City
German name of Czarne, Poland